was a town located in Tōhaku District, Tottori Prefecture, Japan.

As of 2003, the town had an estimated population of 11,894 and a density of 144.70 persons per km2. The total area was 82.20 km2.

On September 1, 2004, Tōhaku, along with the town of Akasaki (also from Tōhaku District), was merged to create the town of Kotoura.

External links
Kotoura official website 

Dissolved municipalities of Tottori Prefecture
Tōhaku District, Tottori
Kotoura, Tottori